The Professorship of Statistical Science is a professorship at the University of Cambridge. It was established in 1994 as the third professorship within the Cambridge Statistical Laboratory.

List of Professors of Statistical Science 

 1994–1996, Richard L. Smith
 2002–2015, L. C. G. Rogers
 2017–present, Richard Samworth

References

Statistical Science
Faculty of Mathematics, University of Cambridge
1994 establishments in England
Statistical Science, *, Cambridge
Mathematics education in the United Kingdom